Jeddah Light is an observation tower, port control tower and active lighthouse in Jeddah, Saudi Arabia. It is located at the end of the outer pier on the north side of the entrance to Jeddah Seaport.

See also

 List of lighthouses in Saudi Arabia

References

External links
 

Lighthouses completed in 1990
Towers completed in 1990
1990 establishments in Saudi Arabia
Lighthouses in Saudi Arabia
Buildings and structures in Jeddah
Transport in Jeddah